Aiyu jelly (or ; or simply ), known in Amoy Hokkien as ogio, and as ice jelly in Singapore, is a jelly made from the gel from the seeds of the awkeotsang creeping fig found in Taiwan and East Asian countries of the same climates and latitudes. The jelly is not commonly made or found outside of Taiwan, Malaysia, and Singapore, though it can be bought fresh in specialty stores in Japan and canned in Chinatowns. It is also used in Taiwanese cuisine.

In Cantonese, it is also known as man tau long (文頭郎). It is commonly served with a slice of lime.

Origin

According to oral history, the plant and the jelly were named after the daughter of a Taiwanese tea businessman in the 1800s. The gelling property of the seeds was discovered by the businessman as he drank from a creek in Chiayi. He found a clear yellowish jelly in the water he was drinking and was refreshed upon trying it. Looking above the creek he noticed fruits on hanging vines. The fruits contained seeds that exuded a sticky gel when rubbed.

Upon this discovery, he gathered some of the fruits and served them at home with honeyed lemon juice or sweetened beverages. Finding the jelly-containing beverage delicious and thirst-quenching, the enterprising businessman delegated the task of selling it to his beautiful 15-year-old daughter, Aiyu. The snack was very well received and became highly popular. So, the businessman eventually named the jelly and the vines after his daughter.

However, the Austronesian name igos, coming from Spanish higo, hints at a possible Austronesian origin for this food.

Harvesting
Fruits of the creeping fig plant resemble large fig fruits the size of small mangos. The figs grow from flowers pollinated by the Wiebesia pumilae. and are harvested from September through January just before the fruit ripens to a dark purple. The fruits are then halved and turned inside out to dry over the course of several days. The dry fruits can be sold as is, or dried aiyu seeds can then be pulled off the skin and sold separately.

Jelly making

The aiyu seeds are placed in a cotton cloth bag, and the bag and its contents are submerged in cold water and rubbed. A slimy gel will be extracted from the bag of aiyu seeds as it is squeezed and massaged. This is known as "washing aiyu" in Chinese (洗愛玉). After several minutes of massaging and washing, no more of the yellowish tea-coloured gel will be extracted, and the contents of the bag are discarded. The washed gel is then allowed to set into a jelly either in a cool location or in the refrigerator. One must keep in mind certain things when making aiyu jelly or else the gel may not set:
There must not be any grease in the container or water used to wash or set the gel,
Sugar must not be added to the aiyu prior to the setting of the gel,
Distilled water must not be used since the gelling depends on the presence of minerals in the water,
During washing, the seeds must not be rubbed so hard as to rupture their shells.
Water will slowly seep out of the jelly some time after it sets, and it will turn back to a liquid over the course of several days.

The jelly is usually served with honey and lemon juice but can also be included in other sweetened beverages or shaved ice and is particularly popular as a cool drink in hot summers.

Chemistry 
The gelling agent in aiyu seeds is pectin. Pectines are located in the transparent layer on the surface of seeds and not the inside of seeds, which is why they are extracted by washing and rubbing instead of grinding to a powder. The main component of the water extract was found to be LMP (low methoxy pectin), as opposed to high metoxy pectins prevalent in commercially used sources such as apples or citrus peels. LMP gels in presence of divalent cations, which are found in sufficient amount in water (when undistilled), thus causing a creation of jelly.

See also
 Taiwanese cuisine
 List of Taiwanese desserts and snacks
 Night markets in Taiwan
Grass jelly
Gelatin dessert
O-aew, a variant of aiyu jelly found in Phuket, Thailand
Bingfen

References

External links
Video of a family making Aiyu jelly
The harvest of the fruit its processing and its nutritional content
Precise making of the jelly

Fig dishes
Edible gels
Taiwanese cuisine
Taiwanese desserts

ja:アイギョクシ
zh:愛玉子